is a Japanese former professional baseball pitcher in Nippon Professional Baseball (NPB). He played for the Osaka / Hanshin Tigers from 1953 to 1963, the Tokyo / Lotte Orions from 1964 to 1972, and the Taiyo Whales in 1973. He is a member of the Japanese Baseball Hall of Fame.

A right-handed pitcher, Koyama threw hard and was known for his effective slider and pinpoint control. He ranks third all-time in the NPB in wins (320), strikeouts (3,159), innings pitched (4,899), and shutouts (74). He won 20 or more games 7 separate times, was selected to eleven All-Star teams, and won the 1962 Eiji Sawamura Award.

Biography 
Koyama attended Takasago High School, and entered NPB at age 18, drafted by the Osaka Tigers.

Koyama won 20 or more games three straight years from 1958 to 1960; in 1959 he led the Central League in innings pitched, with 344. He had at least 200 strikeouts for 7 straight seasons from 1956 to 1962.

In 1961 Koyama suffered his first losing season, going 11–22, leading the Central League in losses despite a stellar 2.41 earned run average.

In 1962, Koyama had 13 shutouts, including five in a row, on his way to a 27–11 record with a 1.66 ERA and the Sawamura Award. He also led all of NPB in strikeouts, with 270. Unfortunately, he lost two games in that year's Japan Series, as the Tigers fell to the champion Toei Flyers. (Koyama ended up on the losing end of three Japan Series, never winning a championship.)

In 1964, Koyama switched teams (and leagues) and went 30-12 for the Tokyo Orions, leading all of NPB in victories, with a 2.41. ERA. He won at least 20 games three straight years from 1964 to 1966 (although in 1965 he also lost 20 games).

With 200+ wins, Koyama was a founding member of Meikyukai in 1978. He was elected to the Japanese Baseball Hall of Fame in 2001.

On May 2, 1992, Tsutomu Seki discovered the minor planet 1992 JE, naming it "13553 Masaakikoyama" in honor of Koyama.

See also 
 List of top Nippon Professional Baseball strikeout pitchers

References

1934 births
Living people
Baseball people from Hyōgo Prefecture
Japanese Baseball Hall of Fame inductees
Japanese baseball players
Nippon Professional Baseball pitchers
Hanshin Tigers players
Tokyo Orions players
Lotte Orions players
Taiyō Whales players
Japanese baseball coaches
Nippon Professional Baseball coaches
People from Akashi, Hyōgo